Rameldange is a small town in the commune of Niederanven, in central Luxembourg.  , the town has a population of 671.

References

Niederanven
Towns in Luxembourg